The following is a list of Pac-12 Rivalry games.  The first rivalry game played was the Big Game between Cal & Stanford on March 19, 1892, with Stanford winning 14−10.  The winner of the Duel in the Desert receives the Territorial Cup which the NCAA has certified as the oldest rivalry trophy in college football.

Pac-12 Non-Conference Rivalry Games

References

Pac-12 Conference football
Pac-12
College football rivalries in the United States